Termo (also, Snowstorm and Armstrong) is a ghost town in Lassen County, California. This town straddles U.S. Highway 395 north of Ravendale.

It was the original 1900 terminus of the Nevada–California–Oregon Railway, before the line was extended north. A post office opened in 1908, closed in 1914, and re-opened in 1915.

References

External links
 Termo- California Ghost Town

Unincorporated communities in California
Unincorporated communities in Lassen County, California
Ghost towns in California